Below are the results of the 2022 World Series of Poker, to be held from May 31-July 20 at Bally's and Paris Las Vegas in Las Vegas, Nevada.

Key

Results

Source:

Event #1: $500 Casino Employees No-Limit Hold'em

 2-Day Event: May 31-June 1
 Number of Entries: 832
 Total Prize Pool: $349,440
 Number of Payouts: 125
 Winning Hand:

Event #2: $100,000 High Roller Bounty No-Limit Hold'em

 3-Day Event: May 31-June 2
 Number of Entries: 46
 Total Prize Pool: $3,300,500
 Number of Payouts: 7
 Winning Hand:

Event #3: $2,500 Freezeout No-Limit Hold'em

 3-Day Event: June 1–3
 Number of Entries: 752
 Total Prize Pool: $1,673,200
 Number of Payouts: 113
 Winning Hand:

Event #4: $1,500 Dealers Choice 6-Handed

 3-Day Event: June 1–3
 Number of Entries: 430
 Total Prize Pool: $574,050
 Number of Payouts: 65
 Winning Hand:

Event #5: $500 The Housewarming No-Limit Hold'em

 6-Day Event: June 2–7
 Number of Entries: 20,080
 Total Prize Pool: $8,435,280
 Number of Payouts: 2,778
 Winning Hand:

Event #6: $25,000 Heads Up No-Limit Hold'em Championship

 3-Day Event: June 2–4
 Number of Entries: 64
 Total Prize Pool: $1,512,000
 Number of Payouts: 8
 Winning Hand:

Event #7: $1,500 Omaha Hi-Lo 8 or Better

 3-Day Event: June 3–5
 Number of Entries: 1,086
 Total Prize Pool: $1,449,810
 Number of Payouts: 164
 Winning Hand:

Event #8: $25,000 High Roller No-Limit Hold'em 8-Handed

 3-Day Event: June 4–6
 Number of Entries: 251
 Total Prize Pool: $5,929,875
 Number of Payouts: 38
 Winning Hand:

Event #9: $1,500 Seven Card Stud

 3-Day Event: June 4–6
 Number of Entries: 329
 Total Prize Pool: $439,215
 Number of Payouts: 50
 Winning Hand:

Event #10: $10,000 Dealers Choice 6-Handed Championship

 3-Day Event: June 5–7
 Number of Entries: 123
 Total Prize Pool: $1,146,975
 Number of Payouts: 19
 Winning Hand:

Event #11: $600 No-Limit Hold'em Deepstack

 2-Day Event: June 6–7
 Number of Entries: 5,715
 Total Prize Pool:  $2,914,650
 Number of Payouts: 858
 Winning Hand:

Event #12: $50,000 High Roller No-Limit Hold'em 8-Handed

 3-Day Event: June 6–8
 Number of Entries: 101
 Total Prize Pool: $4,835,375
 Number of Payouts: 16
 Winning Hand:

Event #13: $1,500 Limit Hold'em

 3-Day Event: June 6–8
 Number of Entries: 522
 Total Prize Pool: $696,870
 Number of Payouts: 79
 Winning Hand:

Event #14: $1,500 No-Limit Hold'em 6-Handed

 3-Day Event: June 7–9
 Number of Entries: 2,392
 Total Prize Pool: $3,193,320
 Number of Payouts: 359
 Winning Hand:

Event #15: $10,000 Omaha Hi-Lo 8 or Better Championship

 4-Day Event: June 7–10
 Number of Entries: 196
 Total Prize Pool: $1,827,700
 Number of Payouts: 30
 Winning Hand:

Event #16: $3,000 No-Limit Hold'em

 4-Day Event: June 8–11
 Number of Entries: 1,240
 Total Prize Pool: $3,310,800
 Number of Payouts: 186
 Winning Hand:

Event #17: $2,500 Mixed Triple Draw Lowball

 3-Day Event: June 8–10
 Number of Entries: 309
 Total Prize Pool: $687,525
 Number of Payouts: 47
 Winning Hand:  (A-5 Lowball Triple Draw)

Event #18: $1,000 Freezeout No-Limit Hold'em

 2-Day Event: June 9–10
 Number of Entries: 2,663
 Total Prize Pool: $2,370,070
 Number of Payouts: 400
 Winning Hand:

Event #19: $25,000 High Roller Pot-Limit Omaha

 4-Day Event: June 9–12
 Number of Entries: 264
 Total Prize Pool: $6,237,000
 Number of Payouts: 40
 Winning Hand:

Event #20: $1,500 Limit 2-7 Lowball Triple Draw

 3-Day Event: June 9–11
 Number of Entries: 350
 Total Prize Pool: $467,250
 Number of Payouts: 53
 Winning Hand:

Event #21: $1,500 Monster Stack No-Limit Hold'em

 5-Day Event: June 10–14
 Number of Entries: 6,051
 Total Prize Pool: $3,934,245
 Number of Payouts: 976
 Winning Hand:

Event #22: $10,000 Seven Card Stud Championship

 3-Day Event: June 10–12
 Number of Entries: 95
 Total Prize Pool: $885,875
 Number of Payouts: 15
 Winning Hand:

Event #23: $3,000 Limit Hold'em 6-Handed

 3-Day Event: June 11–13
 Number of Entries: 213
 Total Prize Pool: $568,710
 Number of Payouts: 32
 Winning Hand:

Event #24: $1,000 Flip & Go No-Limit Hold'em

 2-Day Event: June 12–13
 Number of Entries: 1,329
 Total Prize Pool: $1,182,810
 Number of Payouts: 157
 Winning Hand:

Event #25: $800 No-Limit Hold'em Deepstack

 2-Day Event: June 12–13
 Number of Entries: 4,062
 Total Prize Pool: $2,859,648
 Number of Payouts: 610
 Winning Hand:

Event #26: $10,000 Limit Hold'em Championship

 3-Day Event: June 12–14
 Number of Entries: 92 
 Total Prize Pool: $857,900
 Number of Payouts: 14
 Winning Hand:

Event #27: $1,500 Shootout No-Limit Hold'em

 3-Day Event: June 13–15
 Number of Entries: 1,000
 Total Prize Pool: $1,335,000
 Number of Payouts: 100
 Winning Hand:

Event #28: $50,000 High Roller Pot-Limit Omaha

 3-Day Event: June 13–15
 Number of Entries: 106
 Total Prize Pool: $5,074,750
 Number of Payouts: 16
 Winning Hand:

Event #29: $1,500 No-Limit 2-7 Lowball Draw

 3-Day Event: June 13–15
 Number of Entries: 437
 Total Prize Pool: $583,395
 Number of Payouts: 66
 Winning Hand:

Event #30: $1,000 Pot-Limit Omaha 8-Handed

 3-Day Event: June 14–16
 Number of Entries: 1,891
 Total Prize Pool: $1,682,990
 Number of Payouts: 284
 Winning Hand:

Event #31: $10,000 Limit 2-7 Lowball Triple Draw Championship

 3-Day Event: June 14–16
 Number of Entries: 118
 Total Prize Pool: $1,100,350
 Number of Payouts: 18
 Winning Hand:

Event #32: $1,500 H.O.R.S.E.

 3-Day Event: June 15–17
 Number of Entries: 773
 Total Prize Pool: $1,031,955
 Number of Payouts: 116
 Winning Hand:  (Seven Card Stud Hi-Lo 8 or Better)

Event #33: $3,000 No-Limit Hold'em 6-Handed

 2-Day Event: June 15–16
 Number of Entries: 1,348
 Total Prize Pool: $3,599,160
 Number of Payouts: 203
 Winning Hand:

Event #34: $1,500 Freezeout No-Limit Hold'em

 3-Day Event: June 16–18
 Number of Entries: 1,774
 Total Prize Pool: $2,368,290
 Number of Payouts: 266
 Winning Hand:

Event #35: $2,500 Mixed Big Bet Event

 3-Day Event: June 16–18
 Number of Entries: 281
 Total Prize Pool: $625,225
 Number of Payouts: 43
 Winning Hand:  (No-Limit Hold'em)

Event #36: $1,500 Seven Card Stud Hi-Lo 8 or Better

 3-Day Event: June 16–18
 Number of Entries: 471
 Total Prize Pool: $628,785
 Number of Payouts: 71
 Winning Hand:

Event #37: $1,500 Millionaire Maker No-Limit Hold'em

 5-Day Event: June 17–21
 Number of Entries: 7,961
 Total Prize Pool: $10,627,935
 Number of Payouts: 1,195
 Winning Hand:

Event #38: $10,000 No-Limit 2-7 Lowball Draw Championship

 3-Day Event: June 17–19
 Number of Entries: 121
 Total Prize Pool: $1,128,325
 Number of Payouts: 19
 Winning Hand:

Event #39: $3,000 Pot-Limit Omaha 6-Handed

 4-Day Event: June 18–21
 Number of Entries: 719
 Total Prize Pool: $1,919,730
 Number of Payouts: 108
 Winning Hand:

Event #40: $10,000 Seven Card Stud Hi-Lo 8 or Better Championship

 3-Day Event: June 18–20
 Number of Entries: 137
 Total Prize Pool: $1,277,525
 Number of Payouts: 21
 Winning Hand:

Event #41: $1,000 Super Turbo Bounty No-Limit Hold'em

 1-Day Event: June 19
 Number of Entries: 2,227
 Total Prize Pool: $1,982,030
 Number of Payouts: 335
 Winning Hand:

Event #42: $100,000 High Roller No-Limit Hold'em

 3-Day Event: June 19–21
 Number of Entries: 62
 Total Prize Pool: $5,998,500
 Number of Payouts: 10
 Winning Hand:

Event #43: $500 Freezeout No-Limit Hold'em

 2-Day Event: June 20–21
 Number of Entries: 4,786
 Total Prize Pool:  $2,010,120
 Number of Payouts: 718
 Winning Hand:

Event #44: $10,000 H.O.R.S.E. Championship

 4-Day Event: June 20–23
 Number of Entries: 192
 Total Prize Pool: $1,790,400
 Number of Payouts: 32
 Winning Hand:  (Omaha Hi-Lo 8 or Better)

Event #45: $1,500 Pot-Limit Omaha 8-Handed

 3-Day Event: June 21–23
 Number of Entries: 1,437
 Total Prize Pool: $1,918,395
 Number of Payouts: 216
 Winning Hand:

Event #46: $5,000 No-Limit Hold'em 6-Handed

 4-Day Event: June 21–24
 Number of Entries: 850
 Total Prize Pool: $3,920,625
 Number of Payouts: 138
 Winning Hand:

Event #47: $1,000 Seniors No-Limit Hold'em Championship

 5-Day Event: June 22–26
 Number of Entries: 5,121
 Total Prize Pool: $4,557,690
 Number of Payouts: 1,079
 Winning Hand:

Event #48: $1,500 Eight Game Mix

 3-Day Event: June 22–24
 Number of Entries: 695
 Total Prize Pool: $927,825
 Number of Payouts: 105
 Winning Hand:  (Pot Limit Omaha)

Event #49: $2,000 No-Limit Hold'em

 3-Day Event: June 23–25
 Number of Entries: 1,977
 Total Prize Pool: $3,519,060
 Number of Payouts: 297
 Winning Hand:

Event #50: $250,000 Super High Roller No-Limit Hold'em

 3-Day Event: June 23–25
 Number of Entries: 56
 Total Prize Pool: $13,944,000
 Number of Payouts: 9
 Winning Hand:

Event #51: $400 Colossus No-Limit Hold'em

 4-Day Event: June 24–27
 Number of Entries: 13,565
 Total Prize Pool: $4,476,450
 Number of Payouts: 2,011
 Winning Hand:

Event #52: $2,500 Nine Game Mix

 3-Day Event: June 24–26
 Number of Entries: 456
 Total Prize Pool: $1,014,600
 Number of Payouts: 69
 Winning Hand:  (Limit Hold'em)

Event #53: $5,000 Mixed No-Limit Hold'em/Pot-Limit Omaha

 2-Day Event: June 25–26
 Number of Entries: 788
 Total Prize Pool: $3,634,650
 Number of Payouts: 119
 Winning Hand:  (Pot Limit Omaha)

Event #54: $500 Salute to Warriors No-Limit Hold'em

 3-Day Event: June 26–28
 Number of Entries: 3,209
 Total Prize Pool: $1,444,050
 Number of Payouts: 482
 Winning Hand:

Event #55: $1,000 Tag Team No-Limit Hold'em

 3-Day Event: June 26–28
 Number of Entries: 913
 Total Prize Pool: $406,285
 Number of Payouts: 137
 Winning Hand:

Event #56: $50,000 Poker Players Championship

 5-Day Event: June 26–30
 Number of Entries: 112
 Total Prize Pool: $5,362,000
 Number of Payouts: 17
 Winning Hand:  (No-Limit Hold'em)

Event #57: $600 Deepstack Championship No-Limit Hold'em

 4-Day Event: June 27–30
 Number of Entries: 4,913
 Total Prize Pool: $2,505,630
 Number of Payouts: 737
 Winning Hand:

Event #58: $1,500 Pot-Limit Omaha Hi-Lo 8 or Better

 3-Day Event: June 27–29
 Number of Entries: 1,303
 Total Prize Pool: $1,739,505
 Number of Payouts: 196
 Winning Hand:

Event #59: $1,000 Super Seniors No-Limit Hold'em

 4-Day Event: June 28-July 1
 Number of Entries: 2,668
 Total Prize Pool: $2,374,520
 Number of Payouts: 401
 Winning Hand:

Event #60: $10,000 Short Deck No-Limit Hold'em

 3-Day Event: June 28–30
 Number of Entries: 110
 Total Prize Pool: $1,025,750
 Number of Payouts: 17
 Winning Hand:

Event #61: $1,000 Ladies No-Limit Hold'em Championship

 4-Day Event: June 29-July 2
 Number of Entries: 1,074
 Total Prize Pool: $955,860
 Number of Payouts: 162
 Winning Hand:

Event #62: $1,500 Super Turbo Bounty No-Limit Hold'em

 1-Day Event: June 29
 Number of Entries: 2,569
 Total Prize Pool: $3,429,615
 Number of Payouts: 386
 Winning Hand:

Event #63: $10,000 Pot-Limit Omaha Hi-Lo 8 or Better Championship

 4-Day Event: June 29-July 2
 Number of Entries: 284
 Total Prize Pool: $2,648,300
 Number of Payouts: 43
 Winning Hand:

Event #64: $600 Pot-Limit Omaha Deepstack

 2-Day Event: June 30-July 1
 Number of Entries: 2,858
 Total Prize Pool: $1,457,580
 Number of Payouts: 429
 Winning Hand:

Event #65: $3,000 Freezeout No-Limit Hold'em

 3-Day Event: June 30-July 2
 Number of Entries: 1,359
 Total Prize Pool: $3,628,530
 Number of Payouts: 204
 Winning Hand:

Event #66: $1,000 Mini Main Event No-Limit Hold'em

 3-Day Event: July 1–3
 Number of Entries: 5,832
 Total Prize Pool: $5,190,480
 Number of Payouts: 875
 Winning Hand:

Event #67: $10,000 Super Turbo Bounty No-Limit Hold'em

 2-Day Event: July 1–2
 Number of Entries: 419
 Total Prize Pool: $3,907,175
 Number of Payouts: 63
 Winning Hand:

Event #68: $1,000 Million Dollar Bounty No-Limit Hold'em

 5-Day Event: July 2–6
 Number of Entries: 14,112
 Total Prize Pool: $8,326,080
 Number of Payouts: 2,000
 Winning Hand:

Event #69: $10,000 Pot-Limit Omaha 8-Handed Championship

 4-Day Event: July 2–5
 Number of Entries: 683
 Total Prize Pool: $6,368,975
 Number of Payouts: 103
 Winning Hand:

Event #70: $10,000 No-Limit Hold'em Main Event

 14-Day Event: July 3–16
 Number of Entries: 8,663
 Total Prize Pool: $80,782,475
 Number of Payouts: 1,300
 Winning Hand:

Event #71: $1,111 One More for One Drop No-Limit Hold'em

 5-Day Event: July 7–11
 Number of Entries: 5,702
 Total Prize Pool: $5,707,702
 Number of Payouts: 856
 Winning Hand:

Event #72: $1,500 Mixed Omaha

 3-Day Event: July 7–9
 Number of Entries: 771
 Total Prize Pool: $1,029,285
 Number of Payouts: 116
 Winning Hand:  (Big O)

Event #73: $1,500 Razz

 3-Day Event: July 8–10
 Number of Entries: 383
 Total Prize Pool: $511,305
 Number of Payouts: 58
 Winning Hand:

Event #74: $1,500 Bounty Pot-Limit Omaha 8-Handed

 3-Day Event: July 9–11
 Number of Entries: 1,390
 Total Prize Pool: $1,855,650
 Number of Payouts: 209
 Winning Hand:

Event #75: $777 Lucky 7's No-Limit Hold'em

 5-Day Event: July 10–14
 Number of Entries: 6,891
 Total Prize Pool: $4,711,790
 Number of Payouts: 989
 Winning Hand:

Event #76: $1,979 Poker Hall of Fame Bounty No-Limit Hold'em

 2-Day Event: July 10–11
 Number of Entries: 865
 Total Prize Pool: $1,495,363
 Number of Payouts: 130
 Winning Hand:

Event #77: $1,500 Mixed No-Limit Hold'em/Pot-Limit Omaha

 3-Day Event: July 11–13
 Number of Entries: 1,234
 Total Prize Pool: $1,647,390
 Number of Payouts: 186
 Winning Hand:  (No-Limit Hold'em)

Event #78: $2,500 No-Limit Hold'em

 3-Day Event: July 11–13
 Number of Entries: 1,364
 Total Prize Pool: $3,034,900
 Number of Payouts: 205
 Winning Hand:

Event #79: $10,000 Razz Championship

 3-Day Event: July 12–14
 Number of Entries: 125
 Total Prize Pool: $1,165,625
 Number of Payouts: 21
 Winning Hand:

Event #80: $600 Mixed No-Limit Hold'em/Pot-Limit Omaha Deepstack

 2-Day Event: July 13–14
 Number of Entries: 2,107
 Total Prize Pool: $1,074,570
 Number of Payouts: 317
 Winning Hand:  (No-Limit Hold'em)

Event #81: $5,000 Freezeout No-Limit Hold'em 8-Handed

 3-Day Event: July 13–15
 Number of Entries: 756
 Total Prize Pool: $3,487,050
 Number of Payouts: 114
 Winning Hand:

Event #82: $800 No-Limit Hold'em 8-Handed Deepstack

 2-Day Event: July 14–15
 Number of Entries: 2,812
 Total Prize Pool: $1,979,648
 Number of Payouts: 422
 Winning Hand:

Event #83: $50,000 High Roller No-Limit Hold'em

 3-Day Event: July 14–16
 Number of Entries: 97
 Total Prize Pool: $4,643,875
 Number of Payouts: 17
 Winning Hand:

Event #84: $3,000 H.O.R.S.E.

 3-Day Event: July 14–16
 Number of Entries: 327
 Total Prize Pool: $873,090
 Number of Payouts: 50
 Winning Hand:    (Seven Card Stud Hi-Lo 8 or Better)

Event #85: $1,500 The Closer No-Limit Hold'em

 3-Day Event: July 15–17
 Number of Entries: 2,968
 Total Prize Pool: $3,962,280
 Number of Payouts: 437
 Winning Hand:

Event #86: $10,000 No-Limit Hold'em 6-Handed Championship

 3-Day Event: July 15–17
 Number of Entries: 394
 Total Prize Pool: $3,674,050
 Number of Payouts: 60
 Winning Hand:

Event #87: $5,000 No-Limit Hold'em 8-Handed

 2-Day Event: July 16–17
 Number of Entries: 573
 Total Prize Pool: $2,642,963
 Number of Payouts: 86
 Winning Hand:

Event #88: $1,000 Super Turbo No-Limit Hold'em

 1-Day Event: July 17
 Number of Entries: 1,282
 Total Prize Pool: $1,140,980
 Number of Payouts: 193
 Winning Hand:

Event #89: Tournament of Champions

 3-Day Event: July 18–20
 Number of Entries: 470
 Total Prize Pool: $1,000,000
 Number of Payouts: 60
 Winning Hand:

References

External links
Official website
Hendon Mob results
PokerNews.com coverage

World Series of Poker
World Series of Poker Results, 2022